Südfriedhof may refer to:

 Südfriedhof (Leipzig), a cemetery in Leipzig, Germany
 Südfriedhof (Cologne), a cemetery in Cologne, Germany